Dale is an unincorporated community which is located in Hamilton County, Illinois, United States. The elevation of Dale is 400 feet.

The community is in the Wabash Valley Seismic Zone.

History
Dale was laid out in about 1871 when the railroad was extended to that point. The community was named for Reuben Dale, the owner of a local mill. A post office called Dale has been in operation since 1882.

References

External links
  Official Site

Unincorporated communities in Hamilton County, Illinois
Unincorporated communities in Illinois